Holcocera limicola is a moth in the family Blastobasidae. It was described by Edward Meyrick in 1922. It is found in Ecuador.

References

limicola
Moths described in 1922